Women's union may refer to:

 Bulgarian Women's Union
 Crittenton Women's Union, Boston
 Murba Women's Union, Indonesia
 Lithuanian Women's Union
 Socialist Women's Union of Korea
 Sudanese Women's Union
 Ukrainian Women's Union
 Union of Women of Wallonia, Belgian women's association, 1912–1955 
 Vietnam Women's Union
 Women's Union to Defend Paris and Care for the Wounded, 1871 organization during the Paris Commune
 Yemeni Women's Union